The Progressive Republican Party (Parti Républicain Progressiste) is a minor political party in Algeria. In the 17 May 2007 People's National Assembly elections, the party won despite 1.42% of the vote none of the 389 seats.

References

Political parties in Algeria